Facundo Julián Oreja (born 14 June 1982) is an Argentine professional footballer who plays as a right-back.

Career
Aldosivi were Oreja's first club, who he played for from 2002 to 2008 and scored two goals in one hundred and fifty-one appearances in Torneo Argentino A and Primera B Nacional. In 2008, Oreja signed for Primera B Metropolitana side Nueva Chicago. He went on to feature thirty-three times and score one goal (vs. Brown) as Nueva Chicago finished 2nd in 2008–09. Further moves to San Martín and Ferro Carril Oeste in Primera B Nacional followed between 2009 and 2012, during which time he made a total of eighty-eight appearances along with two goals. On 5 July 2012, Oreja joined fellow Primera B Nacional side Gimnasia y Esgrima.

He played in thirty-six fixtures in his first season with Gimnasia y Esgrima, 2012–13, which concluded with promotion to the Argentine Primera División. In the Primera División, Oreja featured one hundred and twenty-one times for the club across his first five seasons in Argentina's top-flight. On 23 June 2019, after two hundred and twenty-one appearances for the La Plata club, Oreja agreed to depart by penning a contract with Barracas Central of Primera B Nacional. He left the club by the end of his contract in the summer 2020.

Career statistics
.

References

External links

1982 births
Living people
Sportspeople from Mar del Plata
Argentine footballers
Association football defenders
Torneo Argentino A players
Primera Nacional players
Primera B Metropolitana players
Argentine Primera División players
Aldosivi footballers
Nueva Chicago footballers
San Martín de Tucumán footballers
Ferro Carril Oeste footballers
Club de Gimnasia y Esgrima La Plata footballers
Barracas Central players